Eduardo Álvarez Aznar (born 1 January 1984) is a Spanish equestrian. He competed in the individual jumping competition at the 2016 Summer Olympics.

Eduardo is a son of six-time Olympian Luis Álvarez de Cervera.

References

External links

1984 births
Living people
Spanish show jumping riders
Spanish male equestrians
Olympic equestrians of Spain
Equestrians at the 2016 Summer Olympics
Equestrians at the 2020 Summer Olympics